Alsophila halconensis, synonym Cyathea halconensis, is a species of tree fern native to the islands of Luzon and Mindoro in the Philippines, where it grows in forest at an altitude of 1200–1700 m. The trunk of this plant is erect and 2–4 m tall. Fronds may be bi- or tripinnate and more than 1 m in length. Conical spines and scales cover the stipe. These scales are dark brown in colouration and have fragile edges. Sori occur near the fertile pinnule midvein. They are protected by thin, pale indusia.

The specific epithet halconensis refers to Mount Halcon, which at 2581 m is the highest peak on Mindoro.

References

halconensis
Endemic flora of the Philippines
Flora of Luzon
Flora of the Philippines
Ferns of Asia